Olikoye Ransome-Kuti (30 December 1927 – 1 June 2003) was a paediatrician, activist and health minister of Nigeria.

Early life and education

Olikoye Ransome-Kuti was born in Ijebu Ode on 30 December 1927, in present-day Ogun State, Nigeria. His mother, Chief Funmilayo Ransome-Kuti, was a prominent political campaigner and women's rights activist, and his father, Reverend Israel Oludotun Ransome-Kuti, a Protestant minister and school principal, was the first president of the Nigeria Union of Teachers. His brother Fela would grow up to be a popular musician and a founder of Afrobeat, while another brother, Beko, would become an internationally known physician and political activist. Ransome-Kuti attended Abeokuta Grammar School, University of Ibadan and Trinity College Dublin (1948–54).

Career
Ransome-Kuti was a house physician at General Hospital, Lagos. He was senior lecturer at the University of Lagos from 1967 to 1970 and appointed Director of child health at the College of Medicine, University of Lagos and became Head of Department of Paediatrics from 1968 to 1976. He was professor of paediatrics at the College of Medicine, University of Lagos until his retirement in 1988. He worked as senior house officer  at Great Ormond Street Hospital, London, and as a locum in Hammersmith Hospital in the 1960s.

In the 1980s, he joined the government of General Ibrahim Babangida as the health minister. In 1983 along with two other Nigerians, he founded one of Nigeria's largest health focused NGOs – Society for Family Health Nigeria primarily concerned with family planning and child health services at the time. In 1986, he conveyed word of Nigeria's first AIDS case, a 14-year-old girl who had been diagnosed with HIV. He was minister until 1992, when he joined the World Health Organization as its Deputy Director-General.

He held various teaching positions, including a visiting professorship at Baltimore's Johns Hopkins University's school of hygiene and public health. He wrote extensively for medical journals and publications.

He won both the Leon Bernard Foundation Prize and the Maurice Pate Award, in 1986 and in 1990 respectively.

Death
Ransome-Kuti died on 1 June 2003. He was survived by his wife of 50 years Sonia and three children.

References

Nigerian activists
Nigerian pediatricians
1927 births
2003 deaths
Yoruba physicians
Health ministers of Nigeria
World Health Organization officials
Ransome-Kuti family
University of Ibadan alumni
Yoruba activists
People from Ijebu Ode
Nigerian expatriates in the United Kingdom
Academic staff of the University of Lagos
Johns Hopkins University faculty
Nigerian expatriate academics in the United States
20th-century Nigerian medical doctors
Yoruba academics
Alumni of Trinity College Dublin
Yoruba politicians
Physicians from Lagos
Educators from Lagos
Nigerian officials of the United Nations
Léon Bernard Foundation Prize laureates